Newhall Publishing is an employee owned multichannel content publishing and marketing agency. Celebrating 60 years in business Newhall has grown to become one of the country’s leading content publishers. Offering 10 services – print, digital, design, strategy, media sales, subscription & membership management, distribution & fulfilment, data management, client services and event sales – Newhall has built a significant portfolio with a diverse client base including membership organisations, event companies and multinational businesses.

History
The business was established in 1962, when its founder, Joseph K. Douglas, created the "Cancer & Polio Research Fund News Letter," to provide updates on the fundraising activities of the related charity. By 1986 the newsletter had evolved into Candis magazine, published by Newhall on behalf of Candis Club. The company changed its name to Newhall Publishing in 2014 in what was described as a rebranding consistent with the company's expanded focus on the multi-media content marketing industry.  In 2022 Andrew Douglas, grandson of the founder, sold the business to an Employee Ownership Trust giving control to its employees.

References

Magazine publishing companies of the United Kingdom